Bidon may refer to:

People
 Louis Joseph Victor Jullien de Bidon (1764–1839), French officer and nobleman
 Luis Cernuda Bidon (1902–1963), Spanish poet and member of the Generation of '27
 Pierrot Bidon (1954–2010), French circus promoter

Places
 Bidon, Ardèche, Auvergne-Rhône-Alpes, France
 Bidon 5, also known as Poste Maurice Cortier, Algeria

Other
 Bidon, a 1976 album by Alain Souchon
 Bidon, a cycling term for a water bottle

See also
 Bidan (disambiguation)
 Biden (disambiguation)
 Bidin, a surname